Moody Glacier is a glacier between Martin Ridge and the Adams Mountains in the Queen Alexandra Range of Antarctica, draining south into Berwick Glacier. It was named by the Advisory Committee on Antarctic Names for P.R. Moody, U.S. Navy, a Construction Electrician at McMurdo Station, winter 1963.

References

Glaciers of Shackleton Coast